Shane Henderson is a New Zealand politician who is an Auckland Councillor.

Political career

After graduating from law school, Henderson worked as a community lawyer in Henderson.

In 2013, Henderson campaigned as a local counsellor for the Henderson-Massey Local Board, winning a seat and being elected as the deputy chair. In the 2016 local council election, Henderson received the highest number of votes among the Henderson-Massey Local Board candidates, and was elected to be the chairperson. 

In the 2019 local body elections, Henderson was elected as a councillor for the Waitākere ward. He received 14,695 votes, the second highest number of votes and 55 behind Linda Cooper. Henderson was re-elected in 2022.

References

Living people
21st-century New Zealand politicians
Auckland Councillors
New Zealand Labour Party politicians
Year of birth missing (living people)